Potassium inwardly-rectifying channel, subfamily J, member 16 (KCNJ16) is a human gene encoding the Kir5.1 protein.

Potassium channels are present in most mammalian cells, where they participate in a wide range of physiologic responses. Kir5.1 is an integral membrane protein and inward-rectifier type potassium channel. Kir5.1, which has a greater tendency to allow potassium to flow into a cell rather than out of a cell, can form heterodimers with two other inward-rectifier type potassium channels. It may be involved in the regulation of fluid and pH balance. Three transcript variants encoding the same protein have been found for this gene.

See also
 Inward-rectifier potassium ion channel

References

Further reading

Ion channels